Thomas Neville (1939 – 19 October 2018) was an Irish hurler who played as a right corner-back for the Wexford senior team.

Biography 

Born in Fethard-on-Sea, County Wexford, Neville first played competitive hurling in his youth. He made his senior debut for the Wexford senior team during the 1960 championship. Neville went on to play a key part for Wexford during a successful era for the county, and won two All-Ireland medals, five Leinster medals and one National Hurling League medal. He was an All-Ireland runner-up on three occasions.

As a member of the Leinster inter-provincial team on a number of occasions, Neville won three Railway Cup medals. At club level he won one championship medal with Geraldine O'Hanrahan's.

Throughout his career Neville made 27 championship appearances.  His retirement came following Wexford's defeat by Kilkenny in the 1972 championship.

Neville is widely regarded as one of Wexford's greatest-ever players.

Honours

Team

Geraldine O'Hanrahan's
Wexford Senior Hurling Championship (1): 1966

Wexford
All-Ireland Senior Hurling Championship (2): 1960, 1968
Leinster Senior Hurling Championship (5): 1960, 1962, 1965, 1968, 1970
National Hurling League (1): 1966-67

Leinster
Railway Cup (3): 1964, 1965, 1967

References

 

1939 births
2018 deaths
Geraldine O'Hanrahan's hurlers
Wexford inter-county hurlers
Leinster inter-provincial hurlers
All-Ireland Senior Hurling Championship winners